The Eurovision Song Contest 1996 was the third time that Estonia entered the Eurovision Song Contest, and was their first participation since their second-to-last place in the 1994 final. The entrant was again selected by a panel of expert judges, with thirteen entrants into the preselection final. The preselection would end up tied on points, with Maarja-Liis Ilus and Ivo Linna's duet "Kaelakee hääl" winning on the basis of being awarded more maximum points than the runner-up Kadri Hunt. In the final, Ilus and Linna finished 5th.

Before Eurovision

Eurolaul 1996 
The final was held on 27 January 1996 at the Dekoltee nightclub in Tallinn, hosted by Marko Reikop and Karmel Eikner. Some of the participating singers were not actually present and instead appeared on a video wall screen, however Kirile Loo didn't appear at all (not even on the video screen) so during her song there were simply many shots of the stage.

The winner was chosen by a nine-member international jury panel, with Maarja-Liis Ilus and Ivo Linna tying first with Kadri Hunt on 62 points. After a review of the scoring, it was announced that Ilus and Linna were the winners, due to the Finnish judge awarding them with one top vote of 10 points whereas Hunt had not received any top votes.

Several artists had also competed in the last Estonian preselection for the 1994 contest, including Evelin Samuel and Pearu Paulus.

At Eurovision
In 1996, for the only time in Eurovision history, an audio-only qualifying round of the 29 songs entered (excluding hosts Norway who were exempt) was held in March in order for the seven lowest-scoring songs to be eliminated before the final. "Kaelakee hääl" placed 5th with 106 points, thus qualifying for the final.

On the night of the final, Ilus and Linna performed 11th, following Greece and preceding Norway. At the end of the voting they have received 94 points, finishing 5th out of 23 competing countries.

Voting

Qualifying round

Final

References

1996
Countries in the Eurovision Song Contest 1996
Eurovision